A Cinderella Christmas is a pantomime version of the fairytale Cinderella, with a book by Kris Lythgoe, using for its score a pastiche of well known pop tunes. It was first produced in 2010 at the El Portal Theatre in North Hollywood, California. The music includes songs by Lady Gaga, Michael Bublé, Katy Perry, Whitney Houston, Mariah Carey, Jennifer Lopez and Kelly Clarkson among others. Like other pantomimes, the show includes magic, dancing, singing, acting, audience interactivity and sing-a-long segments.

Plot 

The story follows the traditional Cinderella fairytale, with some additional characters. Buttons is the Butler to wicked stepmother Baroness Hardup, and is Cinderella’s best friend. As in most pantomimes, the 4th wall is broken by the cast, who encourage the audience to cheer for Cinderella and boo the Wicked Step-Sisters.

Songs

Act 1 
Let's Get Loud – Ensemble
California Gurls – The Step-Sisters
Just Haven’t Met You Yet – Prince Charming
Just Dance – Company
Taking Chances – Cinderella
Breakaway – Cinderella
When You Believe – Fairy Godmother

Act 2 
Low – Ensemble
Need You Now – Prince Charming and Cinderella
Somewhere over the Rainbow – Cinderella and Buttons
All I Want For Christmas – Ensemble

Productions

El Portal Theatre 
It was first produced in 2010 at the El Portal Theatre in North Hollywood, California, starring Freddie Stroma, Jerry Mathers and Jennifer Leigh Warren. A nationwide search in conjunction with Westfield Corporation was carried out to cast the title role. Celebrity judges included Neil Patrick Harris. This was the first pantomime seen in California for some time and received positive reviews from the press.

The show was repeated in 2011, again at the El Portal Theatre, starring Fred Willard, with Shoshana Bean as the Fairy Godmother. It again received positive reviews.

Pasadena Playhouse 
Pasadena Playhouse produced the show in 2016. It was directed by Bonnie Lythgoe and choreographed by Spencer Liff, with sets by Ian Wilson and costumes by Florencia M. Carrizo.

Roles and principal cast 

*Bean played the Fairy Godmother for the December 24 and December 31 performances

References 

Pantomime
Pasadena, California